Actinolepidae is an extinct family of placoderm fishes which lived during the Early Devonian period. They are considered to be among the most primitive of the arthrodires, and are widely accepted to be phylogenetically basal to the group.

Description

The bodies of Actinolepids are wide and flat, suggesting that most members of this family were benthic fish. Their jaws were comparatively underdeveloped in comparison to the more robust-jawed arthrodires that would come after them, such as Dunkleosteus and Coccosteus, indicating that it likely subsisted primarily on smaller, softer-bodied animals such as mollusks or worms instead of larger, tougher prey animals.

References

External links 
 

Devonian placoderms
Arthrodires
Placoderm families
Early Devonian first appearances
Early Devonian extinctions